James W. Plummer (January 29, 1920 – January 16, 2013) was an engineer who served as the fifth Director of the National Reconnaissance Office. Plummer was the first Director NRO to come from the private industry. He previously served as the Lockheed Corporation program manager for the CORONA and LANYARD imaging systems. Plummer focused on developing the second generation of U.S. satellites – the electro-optical systems. He earned a master's degree in electrical engineering from the University of Maryland in 1953. In 2005 he received the Charles Stark Draper Prize for his contributions to the CORONA project. He died at Medford, Oregon in 2013. He was 92.

References

External links
National Reconnaissance Office: Directors List

Directors of the National Reconnaissance Office
Nixon administration personnel
Ford administration personnel
University of Maryland, College Park alumni
1920 births
2013 deaths
Draper Prize winners
American aerospace engineers
People from Idaho Springs, Colorado
Members of the United States National Academy of Engineering